Firepower (also known as Multi-Ball Firepower) is a 1980 pinball game designed by Steve Ritchie and released by Williams. The machine had a production run of 17,410 machines.

Firepower was the first solid-state electronic pinball to feature 3-ball Multi-Ball, as well as "Lane Change." This allows the player to control the lamps of the topmost rollovers utilizing the right flipper button.

Digital versions
Firepower is a playable table of Pinball Hall of Fame: The Williams Collection and available for The Pinball Arcade as a licensed table. Firepower was also included in the arcade game UltraPin.

References

External links
 
 Firepower Pinball Website

Williams pinball machines
1980 pinball machines